The Brazilian ironclad Herval was a  ironclad corvette operated by the Imperial Brazilian Navy from 1866 to 1879. It participated in the battles of the Paraguayan War.

Design and description 
Herval was an iron-hulled, fully rigged central battery ship. Herval displaced . Its crew consisted of 125 men. Herval was armed with four 70-pounder Whitworth rifled muzzle-loading guns.

Construction 
Herval was built at the shipyards in Plymouth, England. It was the second ship to bear the name Herval, in honor of general Manuel Luís Osório, Marquis of Erval. The ship was originally ordered by Paraguay, who named it Medusa, but it was sold to Brazil as the Paraguayans, in financial difficulties due to the ongoing Paraguayan War, were unable to pay for it. It belongs to the same class as the armored corvette Mariz e Barros. The ship arrived in Brazil on 30 May 1866 and on 19 July of the same year it was officially named Herval, being incorporated into the navy also in the same year under the command of first lieutenant Tomás Pedro de Bittencourt Cotrim.

Service 

Its main actions took place during the Paraguayan War. On 2 February 1867, Herval participated in the bombing of Curupayty. On 2 March 1868, together with the ironclad Brasil, it went to the aid of the ironclads Lima Barros and Cabral, repelling a Paraguayan attempt to board the ships. Also in 1868, it took part in operations in Curupayty, Humaitá and Angostura.

After the war, it underwent renovation in 1875 in Rio de Janeiro. It was decommissioned in 1879, with its machines being removed to be used in the corvette Primeiro de Março.

References

Citations

Bibliography 
 

Gunboats of the Brazilian Navy
Ironclad warships of the Brazilian Navy
1866 ships
Riverine warfare